General elections to the Cortes Generales were held in Spain on the 8 March 1871. At stake were all 391 seats in the Congress of Deputies. The Progressive-Liberal coalition won the elections.

History
General elections of Spain of 1871 were held on March 8 under universal male suffrage. The elections were the first held during the brief reign of Amadeo I, once the Constitution of 1869 was approved. Francisco Serrano y Domínguez, a member of the Liberal Union (part of the Progressive-Liberal coalition), was the prime minister before the elections.

Results

References

 CONGRESO DE LOS DIPUTADOS - HISTORICO DE DIPUTADOS 1810-1977
  Elecciones Cortes Constituyentes - 8 de marzo de 1871

1871 elections in Spain
1871 in Spain
1871
March 1871 events